"Time of Our Lives" is a song by American rapper Pitbull and American singer Ne-Yo, from the former's eighth studio album Globalization and the latter's sixth studio album Non-Fiction. It was released on November 17, 2014, as the third single from the album by RCA Records. The single was produced by Dr. Luke, Cirkut, Michael "Freakin" Everett and Lifted.

The song mark the fourth joint production for co-producers Dr. Luke and Cirkut with Pitbull (after "Timber", "Wild Wild Love", and "We Are One (Ole Ola)") and third for Ne-Yo (after "She Knows" and T-Pain's "Turn All the Lights On"). It became Pitbull's most successful single from Globalization, reaching number nine on the US Billboard Hot 100. "Time of Our Lives" also went to number one on the US Rhythmic chart.

Music video
The music video was first released onto Pitbull's official Vevo channel on December 25, 2014. It was directed by Gil Green. On January 20, 2015, a behind the scenes video was also released on the channel. The video has received over 200 million views, making it 2x Vevo certified.

The video shows Pitbull and Ne-Yo saving up their spare money to save up for a New Year's Eve party in 1999. Pitbull appears in an old school Varsity jacket dancing while Ne-Yo sings along in the crowd of women while sporting a fitted hat and Aviators. American singer actress Fergie makes a cameo at the party.

In the media  
The song is featured in the pilot episode of Cooper Barrett's Guide to Surviving Life, and the 2016 films The 5th Wave and Office Christmas Party.

Chart performance
The single debuted at number 94 on the US Billboard Hot 100 chart, on the week of December 13, 2014. The following week, the song fell off the chart. On the week of January 3, 2015, the song re-entered the chart at number 87. After climbing the chart for three months, the single reached its peak at number nine on the chart. The song is Pitbull's last US top ten hit to date. On October 16, 2020, the single was certified quadruple platinum by the Recording Industry Association of America (RIAA) for combined sales and streaming equivalent units of over four million units in the United States.

Charts

Weekly charts

Year-end charts

Certifications

Release history

See also
 List of number-one dance singles of 2015 (U.S.)

References

2014 songs
2014 singles
Pitbull (rapper) songs
Ne-Yo songs
Songs written by Ne-Yo
Songs written by Dr. Luke
Songs written by Cirkut (record producer)
Song recordings produced by Dr. Luke
Song recordings produced by Cirkut (record producer)
RCA Records singles